Awadhesh Narain Singh  is a leader of Bharatiya Janata Party from Bihar. He is chairperson of Bihar Legislative Council and a former minister. He was appointed to the cabinet in Nitish Kumar's second term as Chief Minister of Bihar in 2008.

References

External Links 

 Profile at Bihar Legislative Council

State cabinet ministers of Bihar
Chairs of the Bihar Legislative Council
People from Bhojpur district, India
Living people
1948 births
Members of the Bihar Legislative Council
Ranchi University alumni
Bharatiya Janata Party politicians from Bihar